Invaders from Mars is the name of:
Invaders from Mars (1953 film)
Invaders from Mars (1986 film), a remake of the 1953 film
Invaders from Mars, the novelization of the 1986 film by Ray Garton
Invaders from Mars (Doctor Who audio), a Doctor Who audio drama from 2002